Reseda , also known as the mignonette , is a genus of fragrant herbaceous plants native to Europe, southwest Asia and North Africa, from the Canary Islands and Iberia east to northwest India. The genus includes herbaceous annual, biennial and perennial species 40–130 cm tall. The leaves form a basal rosette at ground level, and then spirally arranged up the stem; they can be entire, toothed or pinnate, and range from 1–15 cm long. The flowers are produced in a slender spike, each flower small (4–6 mm diameter), white, yellow, orange, or green, with four to six petals. The fruit is a small dry capsule containing several seeds.

Other common names include weld  or dyer's rocket (for R. luteola), and bastard rocket.

Cultivation and uses
Propagation is by seed, which is surface-sown directly into the garden or grass verge. The plant does not take well to transplanting and should not be moved after sowing.

Mignonette flowers are extremely fragrant. It is grown for the sweet ambrosial scent of its flowers. It is used in flower arrangements, perfumes and potpourri. A Victorian favourite, it was commonly grown in pots and in window-boxes to scent the city air. It was used as a sedative and a treatment for bruises in Roman times. The volatile oil is used in perfumery. The yellow dye was obtained from the roots of R. luteola by the first millennium BC, and perhaps earlier than either woad or madder. Use of this dye came to an end at the beginning of the twentieth century, when cheaper synthetic yellow dyes came into use.

Charles Darwin used R. odorata in his studies of self-fertilised plants, which he documented in The Effects of Cross and Self-Fertilisation in the Vegetable Kingdom.

Species
 The Plant List recognises 41 accepted species (including infraspecific names):

 Reseda alba  White Mignonette
 subsp. myriosperma  
 Reseda arabica  
 Reseda aucheri  
 Reseda barrelieri  
 Reseda bucharica  
 Reseda complicata  Glaucous Mignonette
 Reseda decursiva  
 Reseda ellenbeckii  
 Reseda glauca  
 Reseda globulosa  
 Reseda gredensis  
 Reseda inodora  
 Reseda jacquinii  
 subsp. litigiosa  
 Reseda lanceolata  
 Reseda lutea  Wild Mignonette
 subsp. neglecta  
 Reseda luteola  Weld
 subsp. biaui  
 Reseda media  
 Reseda minoica  
 Reseda muricata  
 Reseda odorata  Common Mignonette
 Reseda orientalis  
 Reseda paui  
 subsp. almijarensis  
 Reseda phyteuma  Corn Mignonette
 subsp. collina  
 Reseda pruinosa  
 Reseda scoparia  Canaries Mignonette 
 Reseda stenostachya  
 Reseda stricta  
 Reseda suffruticosa  
 subsp. barrelieri  
 Reseda tymphaea  
 subsp. anatolica  
 Reseda undata  
 subsp. gayana  
 subsp. leucantha  
 Reseda urnigera  
 Reseda villosa  
 Reseda virgata  
 Reseda viridis

References

External links

Data sheet with pictures of weld (Reseda luteola L.) (in German)

Plant dyes